"Sturmmaske auf (Intro)" ("Ski mask on") is a song recorded by German rappers Kollegah and Farid Bang for their third collaborative studio album Jung Brutal Gutaussehend 3 (2017). The single was made available for download and streaming on 28 September 2017 through Alpha Music Empire, Banger Musik and BMG. "Sturmmaske auf (Intro)" was written by Kollegah and Farid Bang, while production was handled by German producers Joznez and Johnny Illstrument.

Background and composition 

On 21 September 2017 Kollegah and Farid Bang announced the single on their Instagram and Facebook accounts. 

"Sturmmaske auf (Intro)" was digitally released on 28 September 2017 through Alpha Music Empire, Banger Musik and BMG as the first single of Kollegah's and Farid Bang's third collaborative studio album, Jung Brutal Gutaussehend 3. It was written by the duo while production was handled by German producer Joznez, along with additional production from Johnny Illstrument.

A "gangsta rap" song, "Sturmmaske auf (Intro)" features a violin-choir-beat and aggressive lyrics.

Track listing
Digital download
"Sturmmaske auf (Intro)" – 3:52

Charts

References

2017 singles
2017 songs
Number-one singles in Germany
Kollegah songs